Cigno was one of four s built for the Italian Navy in the 1950s.

Design and description
Their crew numbered 207 officers and enlisted men. The ships had two Tosi geared steam turbines, each driving one propeller shaft using steam provided by two Foster Wheeler water-tube boilers.

The main armament of the Centauro-class ships consisted of four OTO Melara  Allargato dual-purpose (DP) guns in two twin-gun mounts, one each fore and aft of the superstructure. The guns were positioned over-and-under in the mount and were protected against spray by a gun shield. Four  Bofors AA guns in twin mounts were positioned on the rear superstructure.  The ships were also armed with two fixed single tubes amidships for  torpedoes. A triple-barrel  Menon anti-submarine (ASW) mortar mount was located in front of the superstructure, superfiring over the forward 76-millimeter gun mount. The ships were also equipped with four short-barrelled Menon ASW mortars, two on each side abreast the rear superstructure, and a depth charge rail on the stern.

While the guns were American, the sensors and fire-control systems (FCS) were Italian, although based on American equipment. The frigates were initially fitted with a Microlambda MLA-1 early-warning radar and the OTO Melara guns used a MTL-4 gunnery radar on the OG 2 director, an Italian version of the American Mark 39 radar used in the Mark 57 FCS. The MLA-1 systems were replaced by American AN/SPS-6 radars in all four ships by 1960. The Bofors guns used the OG 1 FCS, based on the Mark 51 FCS. A SQS-11A sonar provided data to the anti-submarine weapons.

Cigno was rearmed in 1972–1973 with three of the first generation of the OTO Melara 76 mm Compact DP guns in single-gun mounts to replace the unsatisfactory Allargato guns and the Bofors guns. The Allargatos were hard to load, difficult to maintain and the mount lacked a sufficient number of ready rounds. The torpedo tubes and two of the short barrel Menon mortars were removed in exchange for two rotating triple tube mounts, one on each side, for  Mark 44 torpedoes. The sensors and fire-control suites were also upgraded, a SQS-36 sonar being added as was a MM/SPQ-2 radar. An OG 3 FCS with an Orion RTN-7X radar replaced the OG 2 director and its Mark 39 radar.

Citations

Bibliography

 

Ships built in Livorno 
1955 ships 
Centauro-class frigates